Highway Call is the debut album by Dickey Betts (under the name Richard Betts), of The Allman Brothers Band. It was recorded in 1974 in Macon, Georgia, at Capricorn Studios. Betts further develops the country sound that emerged on the Allmans' 1973 album Brothers and Sisters. Tracks include "Long Time Gone", "Highway Call", and the extended  country jam "Hand Picked". Guest musicians include Vassar Clements on fiddle and Jeff Hanna on acoustic guitar. The album peaked at #19 on Billboard's "Pop Albums" chart in 1974.

Critical reception
No Depression called the album "exhuberant," writing that "Betts conjured a rollicking brew of bluegrass, western swing, and jazz." The Rolling Stone Album Guide wrote that Betts's "hesitant vocals can't match the pace of his lightning fingers."  AllMusic said "Highway Call stands as the artist's finest solo moment, one that holds his true voice easily expressing itself far from the madding blues wail of the Allmans..."

Track listing
All tracks composed by Dickey Betts, except "Kissimmee Kid" by Vassar Clements
"Long Time Gone" – 4:31
"Rain" – 3:40
"Highway Call" – 4:26
"Let Nature Sing" – 5:10
"Hand Picked" – 14:20
"Kissimmee Kid" – 3:13

Personnel
Dickey Betts - electric guitar, acoustic guitar, dobro, lead vocals
Vassar Clements - fiddle
Chuck Leavell - piano
Tommy Talton - acoustic guitar
John Hughey - steel guitar
Walter Poindexter - banjo, backing vocals
Leon Poindexter - acoustic guitar, backing vocals
Frank Poindexter - dobro, backing vocals
Stray Straton - bass, backing vocals
Johnny Sandlin - bass
Oscar Underwood Adams - mandolin
David Walshaw - drums, percussion
Jeff Hanna - acoustic guitar
Reese Wynans - harmonica
The Rambos (Buck, Dottie, and Reba) - backing vocals

Production
Producer: Johnny Sandlin, Dickey Betts
Recording Engineer: Sam Whiteside, Johnny Sandlin
Remixing: Johnny Sandlin
Mastering Engineer: George Marino
Photography: Sydney Smith
Liner Notes: n/a

Charts

References

Dickey Betts albums
Capricorn Records albums
1974 debut albums